The 1st (1st East Prussian) Grenadiers was an infantry regiment of Brandenburg-Prussia, later Kingdom of Prussia.

17th century 

18th century 
The regiment took part in the First and Second Silesian Wars.

19th century 
During the Napoleonic Wars, the unit was renamed East Prussian Grenadier Regiment No. 1 "Crown Prince". 

In 1855, the 1st (1st East Prussian) Grenadiers "Crown Prince" was moved from Danzig to Königsberg, where it remained. 

The regiment fought in the Austro-Prussian War and later the Franco-Prussian War.

In memory of its former chief, the regiment received the name Grenadier Regiment King Frederick III (1st East Prussian) No. 1 on 21 June 1888.

20th century 
During World War I, the regiment was assigned to the 1st Infantry Brigade of the 1st Division. After the war, the regiment was demobilized in December 1918, and finally dissolved in June 1919.

See also
List of Imperial German infantry regiments

References 

1st (1st East Prussian) Grenadiers at 

Infantry regiments of Germany
Grenadier regiments